Mount Hōei  (Hōeizan) is a flank volcano on the southeastern side of Mount Fuji in Shizuoka Prefecture, Japan. It emerged as a result of the 1707–1708 Hōei eruption of Mount Fuji. Its height is 2,693 meters above sea level, and its name comes from the Hōei era.

Compared to Mount Fuji, Mount Hōei is easier to climb and, at the same time, allows climbers to enjoy the grandeur of Mount Fuji.

See also
 Mount Fuji

References

Mount Fuji
Hoei
Tourist attractions in Shizuoka Prefecture
Hoei
Hoei